Dame Jane Frances Dove, DBE, JP (27 June 1847 – 21 June 1942) was an English women's campaigner, who founded Wycombe Abbey and other girls' schools.

Early life and education

Born in Bordeaux, France the eldest of ten children of Revd. John Thomas Dove vicar of Cowbit, Lincolnshire, Dove attended Girton College, Cambridge but as the University refused to award women degrees she instead received hers ad eundem from Dublin; one of the many so called "steamboat ladies" to do so.

Career

She later became Assistant Mistress at Cheltenham Ladies' College in 1877. From there she went on to become headmistress of St Leonards School, St Andrews, Scotland in 1882. She later founded Wycombe Abbey in 1896, and was its first headmistress. In 1900 she also founded the Godstowe School. On retirement from Wycombe Abbey in 1910, she endowed a scholarship at the school.

She was elected in 1907 to High Wycombe Borough Council. In 1928 she was made Dame Commander of the Order of the British Empire. She died in 1942, six days  before her 95th birthday.

Legacy
In 1933, she presented the Frances Dove Window at All Saints' Church, High Wycombe, to pay tribute to the achievement of women through the ages.

References

Sources
Alison L. Prentice & Marjorie R. Theobald, Women Who Taught: Perspectives on the History of Women and Teaching (1991)
Elsie Bowerman, Stands there a School - Memories of Dame Frances Dove, D.B.E., Founder of Wycombe Abbey School (1965)
Jessie Street (ed. Lenore Coltheart), Jessie Street, a revised autobiography, Federation Press, (2004)

External links
 Reach Information.com
 Women in Local Government - includes pictures

1847 births
1942 deaths
Alumni of Girton College, Cambridge
English justices of the peace
Schoolteachers from Buckinghamshire
Councillors in Buckinghamshire
Dames Commander of the Order of the British Empire
People from High Wycombe
People from Bordeaux
Founders of English schools and colleges
People from South Holland (district)
Women heads of schools in the United Kingdom
Steamboat ladies
Women councillors in England